Birgit Christensen  (born 31 May 1976) was a female Danish football midfielder. She was part of the Denmark women's national football team.

She competed at the 1996 Summer Olympics, playing 3 matches.

See also
 Denmark at the 1996 Summer Olympics

References

External links
 
 
http://www.soccerpunter.com/players/292379-Birgit-Christensen
http://www.hurricanesports.com/ViewArticle.dbml?DB_OEM_ID=28700&ATCLID=205551416
https://web.archive.org/web/20160314035657/http://www.soccertimes.com/worldcup/1999/capsules/denmark.htm
FIFA.com

1976 births
Living people
Danish women's footballers
Place of birth missing (living people)
Footballers at the 1996 Summer Olympics
Olympic footballers of Denmark
Women's association football midfielders
1995 FIFA Women's World Cup players
Denmark women's international footballers